is a Japanese manga series written by Ukyō Kodachi and Masashi Kishimoto, and illustrated by Mikio Ikemoto. It began monthly serialization with Kodachi as writer and Kishimoto as editorial supervisor in Shueisha's shōnen manga magazine, Weekly Shōnen Jump, in May 2016 and was transferred to Shueisha's monthly magazine, V Jump, in July 2019. In November 2020 Kodachi stepped down, with Kishimoto taking over as writer. Boruto is a spin-off and a sequel to Kishimoto's Naruto, which follows the exploits of Naruto Uzumaki's son, Boruto Uzumaki, and his ninja team.

Boruto originated from Shueisha's proposal to Kishimoto on making a sequel to Naruto. However, Kishimoto rejected this offer and proposed his former assistant Mikio Ikemoto to draw it; the writer of the film Boruto: Naruto the Movie, Ukyō Kodachi, created the plot. Both Kodachi and Ikemoto are in charge of the manga. An anime television series adaptation started airing on TV Tokyo in April 2017. Unlike the manga, which began as a retelling of the Boruto film, the anime begins as a prequel set before Boruto and his friends become ninjas in a later story arc. A series of light novels have also been written.

Pierrot's anime prequel also earned praise for its use of both new and returning characters, but the narrative of the manga was noted to be more serious as it focused more on the protagonist. Shueisha has shipped a million copies of the manga series as of January 2017.

Plot

Opening with a teenaged Boruto Uzumaki facing a teenaged Kawaki in the ruins of Konoha, the former recounts his story. The son of Seventh Hokage Naruto Uzumaki, Boruto feels angry over his father placing the village before his family. At that time, Boruto becomes a member of a ninja team led by Naruto's protégé Konohamaru Sarutobi, alongside Sarada Uchiha, the daughter of Sasuke and Sakura Uchiha, and Mitsuki, Orochimaru's artificial son. Sasuke returns to the village to warn Naruto of an impending threat relating to deduce the motivations of Kaguya Ōtsutsuki. Boruto asks Sasuke to train him for the upcoming Chunin exam to impress his father. During the exam, Momoshiki and Kinshiki Ōtsutsuki, the duo whom Sasuke met, abduct Naruto so they can use Kurama, a tailed beast sealed inside his body, to revitalize the dying Divine Tree from the dimension they came from. Boruto, Sasuke and the four Kages, the leaders of other ninja villages, set out to rescue Naruto. The battle ends when Momoshiki, sacrificing Kinshiki to increase his own strength, is defeated by Boruto and Naruto with Sasuke's help; Momoshiki survives long enough to realize Boruto's full potential while warning him of future tribulations and giving him a mysterious mark called "Karma". After recovering from his fight, Boruto decides to become like Sasuke in the future, while entrusting Sarada to follow her dream of becoming the next Hokage.

Naruto and the other learn there is a group called "Kara" searching for people with the marks called Karma. Boruto's team meets Kara's fugitive Kawaki, a boy who also has Karma. Kawaki becomes an adopted member of the Uzumaki family to protect him. However, when trying to protect Kawaki, Naruto and Sasuke are defeated by the leader of Kara, Jigen, who seals Naruto away while Sasuke escapes. Team 7 saves Naruto when Boruto's Karma causes him to be possessed by Momoshiki. After learning of this, Sasuke discovers all Karma users will be taken over by the Otsutsuki clan, including Jigen and Boruto. Meanwhile, a mutiny starts to form in Kara, with Koji Kashin challenging Jigen, while Amado goes to Konoha to seek asylum in exchange for information, revealing the real leader of Kara as Isshiki, who has been possessing Jigen ever since he was betrayed by Kaguya when they came to Earth millennia ago, and that Karma allows the Otsutsuki clan to resurrect via the host's body. Although Koji kills Jigen, forcing Isshiki to reincarnate imperfectly while Kawaki's Karma is removed in the process, Isshiki forces Koji to retreat and leaves to attack Konoha.

At Konoha, Isshiki attempts to find Kawaki, but Naruto faces him head-on, preparing to fight. Boruto transports himself and Isshiki to another dimension away from the village, with Sasuke and Naruto following. Since Boruto is Momoshiki's vessel, Isshiki plans to feed him to his Ten Tails in order to plant a Divine Tree. With Naruto's new power, the Baryon Mode, he kills Isshiki, but at the cost of Kurama's life. Boruto, possessed by Momoshiki, stabs and destroys Sasuke's Rinnegan. However, Sasuke and Kawaki face Momoshiki until Boruto recovers his body. After being defeated, Isshiki requests Code, who was guarding the Ten-Tails, to carry on the Otsutsuki's will by sacrificing either Boruto or Kawaki and becoming Ōtsutsuki himself. Code vows to avenge Isshiki, and proceeds to release two of the strongest cyborgs created by Amado that was supposed to have been disposed off, Eida and Daemon. The female cyborg Eida agrees to help Code kill Naruto if he in turn spares Kawaki for her to have a normal romance with, because her powers of seduction hinders her from experiencing proper love except with Otsutsuki.

Amado gives Kawaki a weaponized version of Isshiki's Karma, which he uses to assist Boruto in fighing Code. However, Momoshiki takes over Boruto's body, forcing Kawaki to kill him on Boruto's orders. However, Momoshiki revives Boruto as an Otsutsuki, at the cost of his own reincarnation. Both Eida and Daemon are revealed to have been reprogrammed by Amado, and turn on Code, forcing him to flee. In the aftermath, Amado reveals that Eida's and Daemon's powers are shinjutsu transplanted from the corpse of Shibai Otsutsuki, an Otsutsuki who achieved godhood and transcended to another plane. He defines shinjutsu as divine abilities more powerful than ninjutsu which can only be used by gods, including the Karma. Meanwhile, Momoshiki appears in Boruto's mind, showing him a vision of his friends fighting him. Kawaki, having deduced that Boruto, being a full-fledged Otsutsuki, is likely to turn evil, sends Naruto and Hinata into another dimension, vowing to kill Boruto and all other Otsutsukis. Boruto confronts Kawaki, and in the ensuing fight, Kawaki slashes out Boruto's right eye. Sasuke arrives and tries to stop Kawaki, but the latter manages to escape.

Production
When the Naruto manga ended in 2014, the company Shueisha asked Masashi Kishimoto to draw the sequel. Kishimoto rejected the idea and proposed artist Mikio Ikemoto, who had been working as an assistant for Kishimoto ever since Narutos early chapters, to draw it instead. A countdown website titled "Next Generation" was used to promote the new manga. In December 2015, the Boruto: Naruto Next Generationss serialisation was announced. Kishimoto said he wanted Boruto to surpass his own work. The writer of Boruto, Ukyō Kodachi, had written a light novel called Gaara Hiden (2015) and had assisted Kishimoto in writing the script for the film Boruto: Naruto the Movie.Besides writing for the series, Kodachi supervises the story of the anime. Kishimoto also acted as the supervisor of the anime for episodes 8 and 9. Kodachi explained that the series' setting which is notable for handling more science than Naruto was influenced by his father, a physician. In order to further combine the use of ninjutsu and technology, Kodachi was inspired by sci-fi role playing games.

Despite Kishimoto revising the manga's scenario, he advised Ikemoto to make his own art style instead of imitating his. Ikemoto agreed and felt optimistic about his art style. While noting long-time fans might be disappointed Kishimoto is not drawing Boruto, Ikemoto stated he would do his best in making the manga. While feeling honoured to create the art for Boruto, Ikemoto stated he is grateful the series is released monthly rather than weekly because producing the required amount of nearly 20 pages per chapter would be stressful; however, he still finds the monthly serialisation challenging. Regular chapters of Boruto tend to exceed 40 pages;  creation of the thumbnail sketches takes a week, the pages take 20 days to produce, while the rest of the time is used for colouring images and retouching the chapters. In drawing the characters, Ikemoto felt that the facial expressions of Boruto changed as the story moved on; Initially giving the protagonist large eyes for the character's interactions with Tento, Boruto's appearance was made more rebellious when he instead talked with Kawaki.

Despite having a lighter tone than Naruto, the series begins by hinting at a dark future. This set-up was proposed by Kishimoto to give the manga a bigger impact and to take a different approach than the one from the Boruto movie. In this scenario, Ikemoto drew an older Boruto, but he believes this design may change once the manga reaches this point. In early 2019, Ikemoto stated the relationship between Boruto and Kawaki would be the biggest focus on the plot as it would progress until their fight in the flashforward. Ikemoto aims to give the series nearly 30 volumes to tell the story. Kodachi drew parallels between Boruto and the post-Cold War era, stating that while the new characters are living in a time of peace, something complicated might bring the world back to chaos.

Although Kishimoto initially was not writing the series, he created multiple characters for the staff to use. Kishimoto did not specify whether Naruto or another important character would die, but he said he would find a situation like this interesting and added that the authors have freedom to write the story as they wish. In November 2020 it was announced that after 51 chapters and 13 volumes, Kodachi would step down as writer, with Kishimoto assuming full writing duties and Ikemoto continuing as illustrator beginning with chapter 52 in the upcoming January issue of V Jump magazine, published on 21 November 2020.

Publication

Boruto: Naruto Next Generations is written by Ukyō Kodachi (1–13) and Masashi Kishimoto (14–) and illustrated by Mikio Ikemoto. It was launched in the 23rd issue of Shueisha's manga magazine Weekly Shōnen Jump on 9 May 2016. It ran in the magazine until the 28th issue published on 10 June 2019, and was then transferred to V Jump in the September issue released on 20 July. The original series' creator, Masashi Kishimoto, initially supervised the manga, which was illustrated by his former chief assistant and written by the co-writer of the Boruto: Naruto the Movie screenplay, Ukyō Kodachi. In November 2020 Kodachi stepped down, with Kishimoto taking over as writer. In order to keep the entire Naruto saga within a hundred volumes, Ikemoto hopes to complete the manga in fewer than 30 volumes. A spin-off manga titled  is written by Kenji Taira and has been serialised in Saikyō Jump since the March 2017 issue. Viz Media later released the first volume of the manga alongside the English dub of Boruto: Naruto the Movie.

Media

Anime

At the Naruto and Boruto stage event at Jump Festa on 17 December 2016, it had been announced that the manga series would be adapted into an anime project, which was later confirmed to be a television series adaptation that would feature an original story. Additionally, an original video animation was previously released as a part of CyberConnect2's video game collection, Naruto Shippuden: Ultimate Ninja Storm Trilogy (2017), which depicts a new mission where Boruto's team has to stop a thief. 

The television anime series, story supervised by the former manga writer Ukyō Kodachi until episode 216, is animated by Pierrot, with character designs by Tetsuya Nishio and Hirofumi Suzuki. The series premiered on TV Tokyo on 5 April 2017. The episodes are being collected in DVDs in Japan, starting with the first four episodes on 26 July 2017. The idea of choosing Pierrot and TV Tokyo again came from an editor of the Weekly Shonen Jump who found it fitting since there was a timeslot available for a young audience. The series is set to finish its first part with episode 293 on 26 March 2023; a second part was announced to be in development.

Viz Media has licensed the series in North America. In promoting the anime, Crunchyroll started sharing free segments of the series in early 2018. On 21 July 2018, it was announced at Comic-Con International: San Diego that the English dub of the anime would premiere on Adult Swim's Toonami programming block beginning on 29 September 2018. In Australia, the anime began airing on ABC Me starting from 21 September 2019. On 21 April 2020, it was announced that episode 155 and onward would be delayed until 6 July 2020, due to the ongoing COVID-19 pandemic.

Soundtrack
The music for the series is co-composed by Yasuharu Takanashi and his musical unit -yaiba-. A CD soundtrack titled Boruto Naruto Next Generations Original Soundtrack 1 was released on 28 June 2017. The second soundtrack was released on 7 November 2018.

Novels
A series of light novels written by Kō Shigenobu (novels 1–3 and 5) and Miwa Kiyomune (novel 4), with illustrations by Mikio Ikemoto, based on the anime have also been produced. The first one, titled  was released on 2 May 2017. A second one was released on 4 July 2017, under the title  The third novel,  was released on 4 September 2017. The fourth novel,  was released on 2 November 2017. The fifth novel,  was released on 4 January 2018.

Video games
The video game Naruto to Boruto: Shinobi Striker was released on 31 August 2018, and contains characters from both the Boruto and Naruto series. In August 2018, another Boruto game was announced for PC. Titled Naruto x Boruto Borutical Generations, will be free to play, with options to purchase in-game items. The game will be available through the Yahoo! Game service. Boruto Uzumaki also appears as a playable character in the  crossover fighting game Jump Force.

Reception

Manga
The manga has been generally well received in Japan; the compilations appeared as top sellers multiple times. In its release week, the first manga volume sold 183,413 copies. The series has one million copies in print . Between 2017 and 2018, it became the 8th best-selling manga from Shueisha. The manga's first volume also sold well in North America, while the series became the sixth-best-selling serialised manga in 2017 according to ICv2. In 2018's fall, Boruto remained as the fourth best-selling manga in North America.

Rebecca Silverman of Anime News Network (ANN) said Boruto appealed to her despite never having gotten into the Naruto manga. She praised how the writers dealt with Boruto's angst without it coming across as "teen whining" and the way Sasuke decides to train him. Amy McNulty of ANN regarded the manga as appealing to fans of the original Naruto series, adding that while Mitsuki has a small role in the story, his side-story helps to expand his origins. Nik Freeman of the same website criticised Boruto's lack of development in comparison with his introduction in Narutos finale; Freeman also said there are differences between the reasons both the young Naruto and Boruto vandalised their village. Nevertheless, Freeman liked Mitsuki's backstory as he did not feel it retold older stories. Reviewing the first chapter online, Chris Beveridge of The Fandom Post was more negative, complaining about the sharp focus on Naruto and Boruto's poor relationship and the retelling of elements from Boruto: Naruto the Movie; Beveridge also criticised the adaptation of Kishimoto's artwork, but he praised the relationship between Naruto and Sasuke as well as the foreshadowing of a fight involving an older Boruto.

Melina Dargis of the same website reviewed the first volume; she looked forward to the development of the characters despite having already watched the Boruto movie; she was also pleased by Mitsuki's role in his own side-story. Leroy Douresseaux of Comic Book Bin recommended the series to Naruto fans, explaining how the new authors managed to use the first volume to establish the protagonists' personalities. Dargis was impressed by the apparent message of the series, which she found was trying to connect to modern audiences with themes such as parental issues and the use of technology, in contrast to Naruto. Douresseaux liked that Boruto's character development had already started by the second volume of the series because it helped readers appreciate him more. The Fandom Post and Comic Book Bin noted the manga made major developments in Boruto's story due how the plot progress in the narrative makes the flashforward more possible and how the new characters get their first death match against Ao in the manga rather than relying on the previous generation. On a more negative review, Manga News criticized the manga for relying on the returning characters Naruto and Sasuke to fight certain Kara villains in the same fashion as Akira Toriyama recycled the heroes Goku and Vegeta during the anime Dragon Ball Super rather than relying on a new protagonist and thus hoped that Boruto and his friends would be more active following events.

Kawaki's introduction in the series has been praised for the impact in the storyline and the rival parallels he has with Boruto in the same way the original manga had between Naruto and Sasuke. Game designer Hiroshi Matsuyama praised the debut of Kawaki in the manga due to his involvement in the narrative as well as the fight sequences he takes part of.

Anime
The anime was popular with Japanese readers of Charapedia, who voted it the ninth best anime show of Spring 2017. IGN writer Sam Stewart commended the focus on the new generation of ninjas as well as the differences between them and the previous generation. He praised the return of other characters like Toneri Otsutsuki and enjoyed the eye techniques. Stewart applauded the characterisation of both Shikadai and Metal Lee, calling their relationship as well as accidental fight interesting to watch and saying Boruto: Naruto Next Generations improves with each episode. Crunchyroll Brand Manager Victoria Holden joined IGN Miranda Sanchez to discuss whether Next Generations could live up to the success of the old series while still reviewing previous episodes of the series. According to TV Tokyo, sales and gross profits of Boruto have been highly positive during 2018 taking the top 5 spot. In a Crunchyroll report, Boruto was seen as one of the most streamed anime series from 2018 in multiple countries, most notably the ones from Asia. UK Anime Network listed it as one of the best anime from 2019 for showing appealing original story arcs not present in the original serialization which contrasted the Naruto anime whose original stories failed to attract the audience.

In a more comical article, Geek.com writer Tim Tomas compared Boruto with the series The Legend of Korra, since both were different from their predecessors despite sharing themes with them. Sarah Nelkin considered Boruto as a more lighthearted version of the Naruto series, but Amy McNulty praised its 13th episode for the focus on a subplot that had been developing since the first episode because its revelations made the series darker. Stewart agreed with McNulty, commenting that the developers reached the climax of the anime's first story arc. The villain's characterisation also impressed the reviewer. Allega Frank of Polygon mentioned that during the start of both the manga and the anime, multiple fans were worried due to a flashforward in which an older Boruto is facing an enemy named Kawaki who implies Naruto might be dead; his fate left them concerned. The series ranked 80th in Tokyo Anime Award Festival in the Best 100 TV Anime 2017 category.

Critics also commented on Boruto's characterisation in the anime. Beveridge applauded the series' first episode, saying he felt Boruto's portrayal was superior to the one from the manga, while other writers enjoyed his heroic traits that send more positive messages to the viewers. Reviewers praised that the returning character Sasuke Uchiha had become more caring toward his daughter, Sarada, the female protagonist of the series, and they felt this highly developed the two characters. Critics felt this further helped to expand the connection between the Uchiha family members — Sasuke, Sakura, and Sarada — due to how their bond is portrayed during the anime's second story arc. Kawaki's fight with Garo was also the most viewed 2021 fight on Crunchyroll's YouTube channel weighted at 30 days.

Notes

Clarifications

Translations

References

External links
 
 

Pierrot Co.,Ltd. page: Japanese, English

2016 manga
2017 anime television series debuts
Adventure anime and manga
Anime postponed due to the COVID-19 pandemic
Anime productions suspended due to the COVID-19 pandemic
Anime series based on manga
Anime spin-offs
Aniplex
Comics spin-offs
Fantasy anime and manga
Madman Entertainment anime
Martial arts television series
Martial arts anime and manga
Manga adapted into television series
Naruto
Ninja in anime and manga
Sequel comics
Sequel television series
Shōnen manga
Shueisha franchises
Shueisha manga
TV Tokyo original programming
Toonami
Viz Media anime
Viz Media manga